Diary of a Chambermaid is a 2015 French drama film directed by Benoît Jacquot, and written by Jacquot and Hélène Zimmer. It is an adaptation of Octave Mirbeau's 1900 novel of the same name and stars Léa Seydoux as Célestine, a young and ambitious woman who works as a chambermaid for a wealthy couple in France during the early twentieth century. Mirbeau's original novel was adapted into films multiple times before, notably Jean Renoir's 1946 film and Luis Buñuel's 1964 film.

It was screened in the main competition section of the 65th Berlin International Film Festival and was released on 1 April 2015, by Mars Distribution.

Synopsis 
In Normandy at the end of the 19th century, a beautiful and ambitious young chambermaid named Célestine (Léa Seydoux) enters the service of her new employers, the Lanlaire family, which consists of a bitter wife and her perverted husband. Monsieur Lanlaire has a reputation for molesting and impregnating his chambermaids, while Madame Lanlaire is known for her domineering attitude over her servants and often fires her chambermaids. She also meets the other servants: Marianne, the overweight and homely cook and the mysterious, older Joseph (Vincent Lindon), the groom, who shares a mutual attraction with Célestine.

Throughout the film, Célestine reflects on her past positions, such as to a middle-aged woman with an elderly husband who was humiliated at a train customs stop after being forced to open a box revealing her dildo. Another significant post was her satisfying employment with the sickly young Georges and his kindly grandmother. Georges became infatuated with Célestine as she took care of him. After resisting his advances at first, Célestine had sex with him, only for him to succumb to his illness and die during the act, horrifying her. Numb from the experience, she left the position.

In the Lanlaire household, Célestine chafes under the demanding and often unreasonable Madame Lanlaire, who frequently derides Célestine for any delay or error and refuses to let her attend the funeral of her mother. Monsieur Lanlaire quickly sets his sights on Célestine, who rebuffs his advances while secretly plotting to manipulate him. The neighbor, Captain Mauger (Patrick d'Assumçao), who has apparently bequeathed his estate to the servant, Rose, after his wife left him for sleeping with Rose, is also interested in her. Célestine also plots to use Capt Mauger for her own ambitions, but Rose becomes jealous after Capt Mauger kills his obedient pet ferret named Kleber after a comment Célestine makes about the pet.

Célestine finds respite in gossip at the house of the village abortionist and in commiserating with cook Marianne. In one conversation with Marianne, she learns that Marianne was attracted to one of her old masters, but was kicked out after becoming pregnant by him and was forced to kill her baby; later, she reveals that she is having sex with Monsieur Lanlaire regularly and she must get an abortion done. One night, after talking with Marianne, Célestine hears agonized screams coming from the forest, which unsettle her.

The next day, she visits Joseph and learns that he is a rabid anti-Semite and propagates anti-Dreyfus propaganda on behalf of local priests. He dreams of owning a business where he can provide a rendezvous for militant right-wing nationalists and acknowledges that he needs a woman like Célestine to make his plan a success. Later, while gossiping with the other women, Célestine learns that a local prepubescent peasant girl was violently raped, disemboweled and murdered, explaining the screams Célestine had heard at night. Célestine suspects that Joseph is the murderer, as he could be placed at the scene of the crime, but this only makes her more fascinated with him.

Rose dies and Capt Mauger admits to Célestine that Rose had disappointed him after getting a servant of her own and failed to keep up the chores she had when she was a servant. He had hoped to die before her, as he had secretly made a second will nullifying the first, ensuring that Rose would inherit nothing. Capt Mauger offers for Célestine to work for him in the same work and sexual arrangement than Rose had with him, but Célestine only promises to think about it, satisfied with her manipulation of him.

Ultimately, she professes her attraction to Joseph and begs to join him. After aggressive sexual intercourse with her, he has Célestine assist him in the theft of the Lanlaire's silverware that would fund his plan, a theft which is blamed on professional thieves. Upon discovering the burglary, Madame Lanlaire wonders aloud why their dogs did not bark at the burglars, so Joseph shoots both the dogs dead. Police start the probe into the burglary. The police ask Lanlaires whether they suspected anyone from the household, especially Joseph, but they give him a clean sheet saying that he had been with them for 15 years and he is very devoted and trustworthy. The police have no clues even after several weeks of investigation. The case is closed unsolved. Joseph quits his position later and Célestine bides her time waiting for him, befriending Madame Lanlaire to get in her good graces before telling her that she is engaged to be married and must soon quit. One night, she sees Joseph's signal through her window and joins him, ruminating that she has been out-manipulated, acknowledging that he is a devil, but he has her completely in his grasp. They leave for Cherbourg and the carriage disappears into the darkness.

Cast 
 Léa Seydoux as Célestine
 Vincent Lindon as Joseph
 Clotilde Mollet as Madame Lanlaire
 Hervé Pierre as Monsieur Lanlaire
 Mélodie Valemberg as Marianne
 Patrick d'Assumçao as Captain Mauger
 Vincent Lacoste as Georges
 Joséphine Derenne as Madame Mendelssohn
 Dominique Reymond as the recruiter 
 Rosette as Rose
 Adriana Asti as the madam
 Aurélia Petit as the mistress

Production

Development
On 9 February 2013, it was announced Benoît Jacquot would direct a film based on the 1900 novel The Diary of a Chambermaid. Producer Kristina Larsen stated that "Jacquot’s version will be the most faithful adaptation of Mirbeau’s novel". In February 2013, Marion Cotillard was in talks to play the central character Célestine, but later dropped out of the film over scheduling conflicts with Macbeth. On 5 February 2014, director Benoît Jacquot confirmed in an interview Diary of a Chambermaid will begin shooting in the forthcoming summer, with Léa Seydoux and Vincent Lindon joining the cast of the film. On 10 April, Cineuropa reported that the Île-de-France Region's Support Fund for the Film and Audiovisual Technical Industry added €440,000 to the film's funding.

Filming
Principal photography commenced on 10 June 2014 and concluded on 30 July. Filming took place in northern France (the heritage railway Chemin de Fer de la Baie de Somme, Le Crotoy, and Berck) and also at locations in and around Paris.

Release
On 14 January 2015, it was announced that Diary of a Chambermaid had been selected to be screened in competition at the 65th Berlin International Film Festival.

The film was released to cinemas on 1 April 2015 in France.

Reception
Review aggregation website Rotten Tomatoes reported an approval rating of 65%, based on 34 reviews, with an average score of 5.99/10. At Metacritic, which assigns a normalized rating out of 100 to reviews from mainstream critics, the film received an average score of 56, based on 16 reviews, indicating "mixed or average reviews".

The A.V. Club'''s Ignatiy Vishnevetsky opined that the film "lacks a unifying principle, as though the director were too eager to address subtexts to bother with text," and concluded: "Nominally, Diary Of A Chambermaid'' is about the moral rot hiding below, but its most lasting impressions come from surface pleasures and barely motivated flourishes of style."

Accolades

References

External links 
 

2015 films
2010s French-language films
2010s historical drama films
French historical drama films
Films about interclass romance
Films set in country houses
Films set in the 1900s
Films shot in France
Belgian historical drama films
Films based on French novels
Films directed by Benoît Jacquot
Maids in films
Le Journal d'une femme de chambre
Films featuring a Best Actor Lumières Award-winning performance
2015 drama films
Films scored by Bruno Coulais
French-language Belgian films
2010s French films
Films based on works by Octave Mirbeau